Belstone Corner is a hamlet in West Devon in the English county of Devon, part of the civil parish of Sampford Courtenay.

The Sampford Courtenay railway station, on the Exeter to Okehampton line, is at Belstone Corner and originally bore this name.

References

Villages in Devon